The 2014 Campeonato de la Victoria or 2014 Torneo de la Victoria was held at the Secretaria Nacional de Deportes in Asunción, organized by Federación Paraguaya de Atletismo. It was the 64th edition.

The competition serves as the Paraguayan Athletics Championships in track and field for the Republic of Paraguay, being the country's most important national athletics competitions.

The 2014 editions saw the last participation of 2004, 2008 and 2012 Summer Olympics Paraguayan representative Leryn Franco.

The championship finished being successful for the athletes of the Paraguay Marathon Club, amongst other clubs, with various athletes achievement first place in their respective disciplines.

ABC Color referenced  Paola Miranda and Víctor Fatecha as the best athletes of the championships.

Results
Results of the competition were published on the official website of the Federación Paraguaya de Atletismo.

Men's

100m

Series 1

Series 2

Series 3

200m

Series 1

Series 2

400m

High jump

Long jump

Triple jump

Shot put throw

Discus throw

Javelin throw

Hammer throw

Women's

High jump

Long jump

Triple jump

Shot put throw

Discus throw

Javelin throw

Hammer throw

See also
 Sport in Paraguay
 Paraguayan Olympic Committee
 Paraguayan Athletics Federation
 Paraguayan records in athletics
 List of athletics clubs in Paraguay

References

Paraguayan Athletics Championships
2014 in Paraguayan sport
Sport in Asunción
October 2014 sports events in South America
2010s in Asunción